Juan Carlos Frecia (born 9 July 1930) is an Argentine fencer. He competed in the individual and team sabre events at the 1964 and 1968 Summer Olympics.

References

External links
 

1930 births
Living people
Argentine male sabre fencers
Olympic fencers of Argentina
Fencers at the 1964 Summer Olympics
Fencers at the 1968 Summer Olympics
Fencers from Buenos Aires